Nightlife is the third studio album by the band Erase Errata, released in 2006 on Kill Rock Stars, and the first not to feature Sara Jaffe. The album also marked the first time they made an official music video, for "Tax Dollar." directed by Jeremy Solterbeck.

Track listing
"Cruising" - 2:42
"Hotel Suicide" - 3:20
"Another Genius Idea from Our Government" - 1:59
"Take You" - 1:58
"Dust" - 2:30
"Tax Dollar" - 2:28
"Rider" - 3:56
"Beacon" - 1:55
"He Wants What's Mine" - 1:29
"Giant Hans" - 2:48
"Wasteland (In A...)" - 3:13
"Nightlife" - 1:52

Personnel
Jenny Hoyston - Vocals, Guitar, Trumpet
Ellie Erickson - Bass
Bianca Sparta - Drums

References

External links
mp3 and video sample of "Tax Dollar" from Kill Rock Stars

2006 albums
Erase Errata albums
Queercore albums
Kill Rock Stars albums